The Arab Mashreq international Road Network is an international road network between the primarily Arab countries of the Mashriq (Syria, Iraq, Jordan, Palestine, Lebanon, Kuwait, Egypt, Saudi Arabia, Bahrain, Qatar, UAE, Oman and Yemen). In addition, part of the network passes through Israel, which is not a party to the agreement that created it as well as non-Arab parts of the region.

The network is a result of the 2001 Agreement on International Roads in the Arab Mashreq, a United Nations multilateral treaty that entered into force in 2003 and has been ratified by 13 of the 14 (all except Israel) countries that the network serves.

Route List

See also
Other intercontinental highway systems: Asian Highway Network, International E-road network and Trans-African Highway network

References

International road networks
United Nations Economic and Social Council
Road transport in Asia
Transport in the Middle East
Road transport in the Middle East